Elizabeth Fox may refer to:

 Elizabeth Fox, Baroness Holland (1771–1845), English political hostess
 Elizabeth Fox-Genovese (1941–2007), American historian
 Libby Fox, fictional character in EastEnders
 Betty Fox (1937–2011), Canadian activist
 Elizabeth Fox, Countess of Ilchester (1723–1792)
Elizabeth Gordon Fox (1884–1948), American nurse